Tærø is a small Danish island in the  Ulvsund Strait between Zealand and Møn, not far from Bogø and the Farø Bridges.

The island is formed by two glacial moraine hills surrounded by coastal meadows and small headlands. Access to the island is from  the harbour at Petersværft on Zealand.

Tærø today
Tærø is privately owned and  most of it is grazed by 180 head of Scottish highland cattle from Tærø Avlsgard, the only farm on the island.

There are also approximately 25 Exmoor ponies roaming freely on the island. They were introduced in the 1960s by a group of researchers. In 2003 some of the horses were moved to Klise Nor on Langeland.

Round Tærø Race
Every year in June, the boat club on neighbouring Bogø arranges the Round Tærø boat race. In 2010, it took place for the 21st time. There are individual competitions for keel boats, motorboats and multihulled boats.

See also
 List of islands of Denmark

References

External links
 Tærø Avlsgård

Private islands of Denmark
Geography of Vordingborg Municipality